Jacques David may refer to:

 Jacques-Louis David (1748–1825), French painter 
 Jacques David (bishop) (1930–2018), French Roman Catholic bishop
 Jacques David (court clerk) (c. 1684–1726), court clerk in Montreal